was a Japanese baseball player known for his long affiliation with the Chunichi Dragons.

He played with the Dragons from 1960–1980, accumulating 2,274 hits and 236 home rums.

A speedy second baseman, he was a seven-time Central League Best Nine Award-winner, a three-time Central League Golden Glove Award-winner, and led the Central League in stolen bases three times. He was an NPB All-Star four separate times. He finished with 369 career stolen bases.

Takagi began as a player-coach for the Dragons in 1978, staying in that role through his retirement as a player in 1980. He stayed on as coach through 1986, returning to the team as manager from 1992-1995, and also from 2012-2013.

References

External links

1941 births
2020 deaths
People from Gifu
Baseball people from Gifu Prefecture
Japanese baseball players
Nippon Professional Baseball infielders
Chunichi Dragons players
Managers of baseball teams in Japan
Chunichi Dragons managers
Japanese Baseball Hall of Fame inductees